Byzantium is an ancient Greek city, later renamed Constantinople and then Istanbul.

Byzantium may also refer to:

Arts, entertainment, and media
Byzantium (album), by Deep Blue Something
Byzantium (band), an English band of the 1970s
Byzantium (film), a 2012 vampire film
Byzantium (play), a 1904 historical play by Ferenc Herczeg
Byzantium, a starship on the Doctor Who episode "The Time of Angels"
Byzantium!, a Doctor Who novel by Keith Topping
Byzantium, a novel by Stephen R. Lawhead
Byzantium, title of season 14, episode 8, of Supernatural

Other uses
Byzantium (color)
Byzantine Empire, sometimes referred to as Byzantium, the medieval Eastern Roman Empire (330–1453), of which Constantinople was the capital
MV Byzantium, a Cypriot cargo ship

See also
Byzantine (disambiguation)
Constantinople (disambiguation)
Istanbul (disambiguation)
The Outer Worlds